A-Grade Investments is a venture capital firm founded in 2010 by actor Ashton Kutcher, entertainment manager Guy Oseary, and billionaire investor Ron Burkle to invest in technology start-up companies. The company is headquartered in Los Angeles, California.

Founding and partners
Ashton Kutcher, Guy Oseary, and Ron Burkle had invested in private equity deals individually, then, in 2010, formed A-Grade Investments to invest in technology startups as a group.

In 2012, Kutcher, Oseary and Burkle raised additional capital A-Grade from several billionaires, including David Geffen and Mark Cuban.

On May 1, 2013, onstage at TechCrunch Disrupt NYC, Kutcher and Oseary confirmed rumors that the fund was valued at over $100 million.

In March 2016, Forbes published a comprehensive article on A-Grade Investments, entitled "How Ashton Kutcher And Guy Oseary Built A $250 Million Portfolio With Startups Like Uber And Airbnb," with Kutcher appearing on the cover of the magazine, which became the most-widely read issue in Forbes’ 99-year history. The Forbes article states that the team turned $30m into $250m.

Investments
Among its portfolio companies, A-Grade has invested in Spotify, Uber, Shazam, Couple, SoundCloud, Muse, and Airbnb. The firm mainly takes part in Seed and Series A rounds.

The firm’s primary targets are consumer-focused businesses that change the way consumers share information, or that disrupt traditional marketplaces.

In a 2011 interview with The New York Times, Kutcher said, “I look for companies that solve problems in intelligent and friction-free ways and break boundaries.”

In a 2013 interview with The Daily Telegraph, Kutcher said, “If we can create efficiencies in that which is mundane, then we accelerate our paths to happiness. The companies that will ultimately do well are the companies that chase happiness. If you find a way to help people find love, or health or friendship, the dollar will chase that.”

Exits
 Katango, acquired, 2011
 GroupMe, acquired, 2011
 Socialcam, acquired, 2012
 Bufferbox, acquired, 2012
 Summly, acquired, 2013
 Interaxon (Muse)
 Nest, acquired, 2014
 Gyft, acquired, 2014
 SmartThings, acquired, 2014

References

External links

Venture capital firms of the United States
Companies based in Los Angeles
Financial services companies established in 2010
Private equity firms of the United States
2010 establishments in California